Pseudotropheus brevis is a species of cichlid endemic to Lake Malawi where it is found in Nkudzi Bay and Monkey Bay in rocky areas. This species can reach a length of  SL. It can also be found in the aquarium trade.

References

brevis
Fish described in 1935
Taxonomy articles created by Polbot